INS Khanjar is a , currently in service with the Indian Navy.

Mock drill
On 30 November 2002 on the high seas off the coast of Vizhinjam.  Mock attack drill was being staged such as Khanjar was targeting INS Jamuna, a hydrographic survey vessel carrying media persons and VIPs, including Air Vice Marshal R. D. Limaye of the Southern Air Command. This was part of the Navy Week celebrations.

References

Khukri-class corvettes
Corvettes of the Indian Navy
Naval ships of India
1988 ships
Ships built in India